Finding J Smith is a New Zealand reality show, also known as Finding J Smith with Vodafone Live! The show aired in 2003 on TV2. The show consisted of contestants calling up as many people in New Zealand with a J. Smith name. $250,000 was the amount of money that was up for grabs making it at the time the biggest prize ever offered by a New Zealand television program. The show was hosted by Nick Young, Eric Young and Dominic Bowden. Team Murphy was the winning team for the show who found Jenny Smith, a 32 year old from Taihape. She was revealed as the real J Smith. The show only ran for one season.

Teams & Candidates

References 

2003 New Zealand television series debuts
New Zealand reality television series